Echo, California may refer to:
 Echo, Inyo County, California
 Echo, California, former name of Echo Lake, California